Under Melbourne Tonight was a weekly live variety hour television program produced by RMITV that broadcast on C31 Melbourne. Reaching a weekly viewership of 55,000 people each week, the show was reviewed in The Ages Green Guide by Jim Schembri on 22 December 1994 as "Sometimes funnier than Letterman". Under Melbourne Tonight was hosted by Stephen Hall and Vin "Rastas" Hedger and featured regular segments with 3RRR's Tony Biggs, Merrick and Rosso's Merrick Watts and Tim Ross, Corinne Grant, Peter Helliar and many more. The show included segments ranging from live music, stand up comedy, movie reviews, music reviews, video game reviews, sports, news, current affairs, science and sketches. In 1998 the show was rebooted as Under Melbourne Tonight Presents...... What's Goin' On There? and Whose Shout at the Stumpy Arms in 1999.

Guests
Musical guests included Lecher Purvy, Cosmic Psychos Weddings Parties Anything, TISM, Pray TV, The Avalanches, The Lucksmiths, Penelope Swales and many more. Stand up comedy guests included Marty Sheargold, Dave O'Neil, Bruno Lucia, Pommy Johnson, Wil Anderson, Rove McManus, Alan Brough, Dave Hughes and many more.

Cast

References

Television shows set in Victoria (Australia)
Australian community access television shows
English-language television shows
1994 Australian television series debuts
1997 Australian television series endings
RMITV productions